Nergaard Peak is a peak (2,475 m) located 3 nautical miles (6 km) south of Niels Peak in the Gagarin Mountains of Queen Maud Land. It was mapped by Norwegian cartographers from air photos and surveys by the Norwegian Antarctic Expedition, 1956–60. Both Nergaard Peak and Niels Peak are named for Niels Nergaard, a scientific assistant with the Norwegian Antarctic Expedition, 1956–58. Both names were proposed in 1967 by the Norwegian philologist Per Hovda (1908–1997).

References

Mountains of Queen Maud Land
Princess Astrid Coast